Brønshøj Water Tower (Danish: Brønshøj Vandtårn) is a water tower in the Brønshøj district of Copenhagen, Denmark. It is owned by Hofor and was listed in 2000.

History
The water tower was designed by Ib Lunding who worked as project architect under City Architect Poul Holsøe. It was listed in 2000 and went through a major renovation in 2005.

Architecture
The water tower is built in reinforced concrete. It has a round foot print and pilasters at close intervals. The lower part of the structure has round windows in a helix arrangement. It has a diameter of 20 m and is 34 m tall.

References

Water towers in Copenhagen
Listed buildings and structures in Denmark
Buildings and structures completed in 1928